Andrew Clough (5 January 1970 in Nottingham - 4 July 2007 in Melbourne) was a British slalom canoer who competed in the early-to-mid 1990s. He finished 12th in the C-2 event at the 1992 Summer Olympics in Barcelona. He died in a car accident in Australia in 2007. At the time he was working as a chemical engineer for ModuSpec in Melbourne.

References
Sports-Reference.com profile

1970 births
English male canoeists
Canoeists at the 1992 Summer Olympics
Olympic canoeists of Great Britain
2007 deaths
Sportspeople from Nottingham
Road incident deaths in Victoria (Australia)
British male canoeists